TME, or thiometaescaline, is a series of lesser-known psychedelic drugs similar in structure to mescaline. Their structures are based on that of metaescaline. They were first synthesized by Alexander Shulgin and recorded in his book PiHKAL (Phenethylamines i Have Known And Loved).  Very little is known about their dangers or toxicity.

TME compounds

See also 

 Phenethylamine
 Psychedelics, dissociatives and deliriants
 PiHKAL
 Mescaline
 Metaescaline

External links 
 3-TME entry in PiHKAL
 3-TME entry in PiHKAL • info
 4-TME entry in PiHKAL
 4-TME entry in PiHKAL • info
 5-TME entry in PiHKAL
 5-TME entry in PiHKAL • info

Psychedelic phenethylamines
Methoxy compounds
Thioethers